is a railway station located in the city of Gifu, Gifu Prefecture,  Japan, operated by the private railway operator Meitetsu.  It is one of the two major railway stations of the city along with JR Gifu Station.

Lines
It is also a terminus for the 17.6 kilometer  Meitetsu Kakamigahara Line.

Station layout

Meitetsu Gifu Station has three island platform arranged in a "V"-shape. Platforms 1-4 are elevated, and serve the Nagoya Main Line, and also onward service for trains of the Meitetsu Takehana Line and Meitetsu Hashima Line. Platforms 5-6 is on the ground-level, and serves the Kakamigahara Line and onward service for trains of the Meitetsu Inuyama Line.

Adjacent stations

History
The rail line originally opened on February 11, 1911, as the Nagazumi-cho Station; at the time, it was operated by the Mino Electric Railroad, Co. On December 26, 1914, Shin-Gifu Station (the present-day station) on the Mino Electric Railroad's Kasamatsu Line (present day Nagoya Line) began operations. Service was again expanded on December 28, 1928 when the Kakamigahara Railroad (present day Kakamigahara Line) began operating from the Nagazumi-cho Station.

April 18, 1948: Shin-Gifu Station of the Meigi Line (present day Nagoya Line) merged with Nagazumi-cho Station of the Kakamigahara Line. The Nagazumi-cho Station was renamed the Shin-Gifu Eki-mae Station as part of the Inner Gifu City Line.
June 25, 1970: The Kanda Line opened, allowing trains from the Mino-machi Line to run on it.
1988: Platforms for Tracks 3 and 4 were extended, increasing their capacity from four to eight cars.
January 1, 2005: The station was renamed Meitetsu Gifu Station.
April 1, 2005: Track 7 and the Shin-Gifu Eki-mae Station were closed.
January 29, 2005: The station was renamed from   when the new Rapid Limited Express service to Chūbu Centrair International Airport was introduced.
July 14, 2007: The new entrance to the station was completed.

External links

 

Railway stations in Japan opened in 1911
Buildings and structures in Gifu
Railway stations in Gifu Prefecture